Sickness and Misery is an album by God Forbid. It is a combination of their first album, Reject the Sickness, and their first EP, Out of Misery.

Track listing

Personnel
 Byron Davis – lead vocals
 Doc Coyle – lead guitar
 Dallas Coyle – rhythm guitar
 John "Beeker" Outcalt – bass guitar
 Corey Pierce – drums

God Forbid albums
2007 compilation albums
Albums produced by Steve Evetts